Webb Summit is an unincorporated community in Hocking County, in the U.S. state of Ohio.

History
A post office called Webb Summit was established in 1873 and remained in operation until 1919. The community derives its name from Benjamin Webb, a pioneer minister.

References

Unincorporated communities in Hocking County, Ohio
Unincorporated communities in Ohio